The Brodie landing system was a unique method of launching and landing light aircraft that was devised by Captain James H. Brodie, a member of the United States Army Air Forces during World War II. The novel system involved catching an overhead hook attached to the plane with a sling, which itself was attached to a cable secured between towers and acted as an arresting gear. This system was designed for launching and recovering small, lightweight liaison aircraft in terrain normally unsuitable for runway construction, such as dense jungle or in the mountains,. However, it was never tested and proved useful in those environments due to its late adoption in the war. One of its perceived advantages was that its small size would render it much harder to detect by the enemy than a conventional landing strip.

After successful demonstrations on scrub-covered flat land, the system was tested in September 1943 for shipboard use when it was installed on the motor ship . Staff Sergeant R. A. Gregory performed ten successful takeoffs and hookups without incident with a Stinson L-5 Sentinel, but those operations were conducted under ideal weather and sea conditions.

The system was adopted by the Navy and later used for launching liaison aircraft at Okinawa, Saipan, and Iwo Jima from ships called LST's. The device allowed existing vessels to be quickly converted to light aircraft carriers with few structural changes. Even though it was employed at sea with moderate success (several aircraft were lost), the pitching and rolling of the ship due to wave action made the device better suited for fixed installations on land. The Navy program was not expanded and CVE escort aircraft carriers were allocated for use during the planned invasion of Japan.   

Brodie and test pilot Flight Officer Raymond Gregory were awarded the Legion of Merit for their work on the system in 1945. Brodie envisioned scaling the system up to capture planes as heavy as 7000 lbs. He was issued US Patent # 2,435,197, # 2,488,050, # 2,488,051, # 3,163,380 for variations of the landing system.

Operational history
LST 776, LST 393, and LST 325 were outfitted with Brodie landing systems.
The RAF used an L-5 for testing the Brodie system in India.
One type of light aircraft which used the system was the Stinson L-5 Sentinel, an example of which is displayed in Brodie configuration at the Steven F. Udvar-Hazy Center museum in Dulles, Virginia.

See also
 Merchant aircraft carrier
 Fighter catapult armed auxiliary ship
 CAM ship
 Aviation-capable naval vessel
 Aircraft catapult

References

Bibliography
 
 Brodie Aerofiles - A Runway on a Rope, Accessed 2 September 2005

External links
 "L-5 Used in Pacific With Brodie System YouTube
 Brodie System in use for both takeoff and recovery with Piper L-4 and Stinson L-5 aircraft YouTube

Types of take-off and landing
Naval aviation technology